Vicente Mijares Saldivar (born 14 June 1954) is a Mexican former professional boxer who competed from 1974 to 1984. He challenged for the WBC lightweight title in 1977.

He's the uncle of three-time world champion Cristian Mijares.

Professional career

In June 1977, Mijares lost to WBC lightweight champion Esteban De Jesus, the bout was held at the Loubriel Stadium in Bayamon, Puerto Rico.

See also
Notable boxing families

References

External links

Boxers from Durango
People from Gómez Palacio, Durango
Lightweight boxers
1954 births
Living people
Mexican male boxers